Karastoyanova is a surname. Notable people with the surname include:

 Helene Karastoyanova (born 1933), Bulgarian composer
 Poli Karastoyanova (born 1969), Bulgarian politician